This is a list of people who have served as Lord Lieutenant of the Isle of Wight:

1 April 1974 – 1979: Louis Mountbatten, 1st Earl Mountbatten of Burma (previously Governor of the Isle of Wight)
1980–1985: Sir John Norris Nicholson, 2nd Baronet
25 February 1986 – 1995: David Seely, 4th Baron Mottistone (also Governor 1992–1995)
18 December 1995 – 2006: Sir Christopher Donald Jack Bland
24 October 2006 – 25 March 2019: Major-General Sir Martin Spencer White
 25 March 2019 – : Susan Sheldon

References

External links 
 

Lord Lieutenant of the Isle of Wight
Isle of Wight